The WAFU U-20 Championship is an association football tournament that is contested between West African nations. It was funded by The Economic Community Of West African States.

Eligible participants

2018 edition 

In 2018, the WAFU Championship was relaunched and the championship was placed in two different tournaments based on the zones.

WAFU Zones (A&B)

Tournaments

See also
WAFU Zone B U-20 Tournament
WAFU Zone A U-20 Tournament

References

External links 
 WafuOnline.com - Official Site

 
International association football competitions in Africa
West African Football Union competitions